Trump most commonly refers to:
 Donald Trump (born 1946), president of the United States from 2017 to 2021
 Trump (card games), any playing card given an ad-hoc high rank

Trump may also refer to:

Businesses and organizations 
 Donald J. Trump Foundation, a charity (1988–2019)
 The Trump Organization, a business conglomerate founded in 1928
 Trump Shuttle, an airline (1989–1992; callsign: TRUMP)

Film 
 Trump: The Kremlin Candidate?, a 2017 British television film
 Trump: What's the Deal?, an American documentary film screened in 1991 and released in 2015

Games and cards 
 Court piece or trumps, a trick-taking card game related to whist
 Top Trumps, a card game series
 Trump: The Game, a board game
 Major Arcana or trumps, special cards in the Tarot pack

Literature 
 Trump (magazine), a 1957 humor magazine
 Trump: The Art of the Deal, a 1987 book by Donald Trump and Tony Schwartz
 Trump: The Deals and the Downfall, a 1992 biography by Wayne Barrett
 Trump: The Art of the Comeback, a 1997 book by Donald Trump and Kate Bohner
 Trump: Surviving at the Top, a 1990 book by Donald Trump and Charles Leerhsen

Places 
 Trump, Colorado, U.S.
 Trump, Maryland, U.S.
 Trump, Ohio, U.S.
 Trump Islands, Antarctica
 Trump Islands (Newfoundland and Labrador), Canada
 Trump Street, City of London, UK

Watercraft 
 HMS Trump (P333), a British submarine, 1944–1969
 USCGC William Trump (WPC-1111), a US Coast Guard cutter

Other uses 
 Trump (surname), a family name (including a list of persons with the name)
 Family of Donald Trump, the family of the 45th US president
 Trump (video game player) or Jeffrey Shih (born 1987), Hearthstone streamer and competitor
 The Trump (horse), an Australian racehorse
 Trump (dog), a pug owned by English painter William Hogarth
 Trumpet or trump
 Trumping, an act of flatulence

See also 
 Donald Trump (disambiguation)
 Jew's trump or Jew's harp, a small musical instrument played in the mouth
 "The Last Trump", a fantasy story by Isaac Asimov
 "The last trump", a trumpet call signaling the resurrection of the dead in 1 Corinthians 15
 List of things named after Donald Trump
 Thumptown, Pennsylvania, United States (also known as "Trumptown")
 Tromp (disambiguation)
 Trump card (disambiguation)
 Trumped (disambiguation)
 Trumpf, a machine tool company
 Trumpy (disambiguation)
 Van Trump (disambiguation)
 Warden Trump, a character in Dragon Quest Monsters: Joker